Baldonnel may refer to:

Baldonnel, Dublin, Ireland, an industrial/agricultural suburb
Casement Aerodrome, also known as Baldonnel Aerodrome, an Irish military air base 
Baldonnel, British Columbia, Canada, a town 
Baldonnel Formation, a geological formation in the area of the Canadian town